The Volvo B8L is a 3-axle bus chassis, for double-decker buses, manufactured by Volvo Buses since 2018, with pre-production batches being produced as early as in 2016.

History
In 2017, two pre-production Volvo B8Ls were completed; one with a Wright Eclipse Gemini 2 body that entered service with Kowloon Motor Bus (KMB) in Hong Kong (Registered as UU8290, fleet number AVBWL1) and a Wright Gemini 3 bodied example with SBS Transit in Singapore (registered as SG4003D).

The B8L was officially launched in January 2018 as a replacement for the Volvo B9TL. A MCV EvoSeti bodied example of Kowloon Motor Bus completed Motor Vehicle Examination and tilt test in early 2018. The MCV bodied B8L was registered in March 2019 as WA756 with fleet number AVBML1. Another MCV bodied B8L was arrived to Hong Kong in April 2019 and was registered in December 2019 as WM5028 with fleet number AVBML2.

In October 2018, orders for 213 Wrightbus bodied examples for Hong Kong were announced, 46 for Citybus, 150 for KMB, 10 for Long Win Bus and seven for New World First Bus. This was followed in November with an announcement of 42 Alexander Dennis Enviro400 XLB-bodied vehicles for Lothian Buses of Edinburgh, with a subsequent order for another 36 vehicles bringing their total to 78.

In October 2019, KMB ordered 110 MCV bodied B8Ls, the first batch of B8Ls to be 12.8m in length. Some of these have been shipped to Hong Kong as of July 2020, and entered service in October 2020.

In November 2019, Prasarana Malaysia ordered 90 Gemilang Coachworks-bodied B8L's for RapidKL's Rapid Bus fleet as part of its fleet replacement programme. The first 3 buses, registered as VEN634, VEN1373 and VEN9768 entered service with RapidKL on 1 June 2020, with the remaining units to be delivered and operated in stages.

In  January 2021, Long Win Bus issued a contract to Volvo Buses Hong Kong. The contract stated that the ten B8Ls in Long Win Bus's possession will have their luggage racks removed and six extra seats installed. In addition these buses with be re-painted with KMB's livery and transferred to KMB service. This is done due to Long Win Bus reaching its maximum number of buses in operation and the drastic decrease in the number of passengers going from the New Territories to the Hong Kong International Airport, of which this service is the sole franchise Long Win Bus has, due to the COVID-19 pandemic. 

As of August 2020, 159 Volvo B8Ls are in service with KMB, 23 are in service with Citybus (Fleet numbers 8800-8822), 7 are in service with NWFB (Fleet numbers 5230-5236) and 10 are in service with RapidKL.

3 Volvo B8Ls with Gemilang bodies were delivered to Australia in March 2022 and entered service during May 2022. All 3 are currently in service with Transit Systems Sydney operating out of Smithfield Depot.

Gallery

References

External links
 
 Specifications Volvo Buses Hong Kong

Double-decker buses
Low-floor buses
Tri-axle buses
B08L
Vehicles introduced in 2017